The 2021–22 Bowling Green Falcons men's basketball team represented Bowling Green State University in the 2021–22 NCAA Division I men's basketball season. The Falcons, led by seventh-year head coach Michael Huger, played their home games at the Stroh Center in Bowling Green, Ohio as members of the Mid-American Conference.

Previous season

The Falcons finished the 2020–21 season 14-12 overall, 10–8 in MAC play to finish in 6th place in conference. They received an invitation to the CBI where they lost in the quarterfinals to Stetson.

Offseason

Departures

Incoming transfers

2021 recruiting class

Roster

Schedule and results

|-
!colspan=12 style=| Exhibition

|-
!colspan=12 style=| Non-conference regular season

|-
!colspan=12 style=| MAC regular season

|-

Source

References

Bowling Green Falcons men's basketball seasons
Bowling Green
Bowling Green Falcons men's basketball
Bowling Green Falcons men's basketball